Inedo is a software product company with headquarters in Berea, Ohio. It that makes Enterprise DevOps tools, namely BuildMaster, ProGet, and Otter. Inedo also publishes software-related products, including Release! the Game, Programming Languages ABC++,  Code Offsets, and The Daily WTF.

History  
Inedo was founded in 2007 and initially started as a custom software and development training company. 

In 2010, Inedo officially launched their first software product, BuildMaster. This was followed with the tools ProGet in 2012 and Otter in 2016.

In 2015, Inedo was named a “Cool Vendors in DevOps” by Gartner.

In 2016, Inedo acquired NuGet Server, a small service wrapper for the NuGet.Server NuGet package.

In both 2016 and 2017, Inedo was recognized in the Gartner Magic Quadrant for Application Release Automation.

In 2017 Inedo announced an expansion to Japan including adding offices in Tokyo and being the primary organizer and sponsor of DevOps Days Tokyo 2017.

Tools 
 BuildMaster – application release automation tool
 ProGet – universal package manager
 Otter – Infrastructure as Code
  Romp - Command-line platform for creating and deploying Universal packages

Other projects

Release! 
In 2014, Inedo published a card game “Release!” marketed as “a light card game about software and the people who make it”. The Kickstarter for Release! was supported and fully funded in under a week.

Programming Languages ABC++ 
The second Inedo Kickstarter project, Programming Languages ABC++, an alphabet book for toddlers and their adult counterparts, was fully funded in 2 days. The project was a joint collaboration with Michael and Martine Dowden, who had the idea and approached Inedo to illustrate and publish it.

Code Offsets 
Code Offsets is an initiative by Inedo to “offset” lines of bad code. The proceeds from code offsets go towards various organizations and projects that benefit the development community. 
The proceeds of the  original run of “Bad Code Offsets” were donated to the Open Source Initiative, jQuery, PostgreSQL and the Apache Software Foundation.

Proceeds from Code Offsets 2016 benefit Tech Corps, a nonprofit organization dedicated to ensuring K-12 students have equal access to technology programs.

The denomination and personas featured on the 2016 editions are as follows:

 1 John von Neumann
 2 Charles Babbage
 5 Herman Hollerith 
 10 Alan Turing 
 20 Grace Hopper
 50 Seymour Cray 
 100 Konrad Zuse 
 500 Edgar Codd 
 1000 Ada Lovelace

The Daily WTF 
Inedo CEO Alex Papadimoulis, is the founder and creator of The Daily WTF, a humorous blog dedicated to “Curious Perversion in IT”.

References

Software companies based in Ohio
Software companies established in 2007
Software companies of the United States
2007 establishments in Ohio